Raymond George Wallace (born 2 October 1969 in Lewisham) is an English former footballer who played in the Football League and Premier League for Southampton, Leeds United, Swansea City, Reading, Stoke City and Hull City, in the Scottish Football League for Airdrieonians, and in the League of Ireland for Drogheda United. He was capped for the England under-21 team.

Playing career

Southampton
Wallace signed for Southampton Football Club as an apprentice in 1986 along with his twin brother Rod. Elder brother Danny had already become an established member of the Southampton first team. In the early part of his career Wallace was regarded as promising talent, if slightly lightweight, playing as right fullback or right defensive midfield.

On 22 October 1988, he made his Southampton debut, replacing Gerry Forrest at The Dell against Sheffield Wednesday alongside his two brothers; this was the first time three brothers had played in the same team in the Football League First Division for 67 years. He was a virtual ever-present until September 1989, when he lost his place to Jason Dodd through suspension, after which he played only once more for the Saints. While a Southampton player, he won four caps for the England under-21 team.

Leeds United
In May 1991, Leeds United signed Wallace and twin brother Rod in the same transaction, with Wallace being valued at £100,000. Rod formed a successful strike partnership with Lee Chapman, but Ray made only seven appearances for the club, and spent time on loan to Swansea City and Reading.

Stoke City
In August 1994 Wallace joined Stoke City on a free transfer. He made a slow start to his Stoke career and by December 1994 he was loaned out to Second Division Hull City where he made seven appearances. He returned to the Victoria Ground in January 1995 and ended the 1994–95 season with 28 appearances. Manager Lou Macari used Wallace in a different role in 1995–96 playing him alongside Nigel Gleghorn in centre midfield. It worked well as Stoke reached the play-offs where they lost 1–0 to Leicester City and Wallace won the player of the year award jointly with goalkeeper Mark Prudhoe. He missed just one match in 1996–97 as Stoke finished in a mid-table position of 12th. The 1997–98 season saw Stoke play at the new Britannia Stadium but results were poor and relegation to the third tier was suffered. Under Brian Little in 1998–99 Wallace was used mainly as a substitute and was released by the club at the end of the season.

Later career
He went on to play for clubs including Airdrieonians (one game in the Scottish First Division), Altrincham (one game in the Conference, in which he was brought down for a penalty from which Altrincham scored the only goal of the game), Winsford United, League of Ireland club Drogheda United, and Witton Albion.

Career statistics
Source:

A.  The "Other" column constitutes appearances and goals in the Anglo-Italian Cup, Football League Trophy, Football League play-offs and Full Members Cup.

Honours
Stoke City
Stoke City player of the year: 1996

References

External links
 
 

1969 births
Living people
Footballers from Lewisham
English footballers
England under-21 international footballers
Southampton F.C. players
Leeds United F.C. players
Swansea City A.F.C. players
Stoke City F.C. players
Reading F.C. players
Hull City A.F.C. players
Airdrieonians F.C. (1878) players
Altrincham F.C. players
Winsford United F.C. players
Drogheda United F.C. players
Witton Albion F.C. players
English Football League players
Premier League players
National League (English football) players
League of Ireland players
Expatriate association footballers in the Republic of Ireland
Association football fullbacks
English twins
Twin sportspeople